Borgone Susa is a comune (municipality) in the Metropolitan City of Turin in the Italian region Piedmont, located in the Val di Susa about  west of Turin.

References

External links
 Official website

Cities and towns in Piedmont